Scott Thomas may refer to:

Scott Thomas (American football) (born 1964), American football player
Scott Thomas (district attorney) (born 1966), American district attorney
Scott Thomas (ice hockey) (born 1970), ice hockey player in the NHL
Scott Thomas (footballer) (born 1974), English football (soccer) player
Scott Thomas (director), American director of the film Plane Dead and creator of Pacific Entertainment Group

See also
 Thomas Scott (disambiguation)
 Thomas (surname)